John Whitehall Stevens (c. 1811 – 30 March 1891) was an Indian-born Australian cricketer who played for Victoria. He was born in Bombay and died in Marylebone.

Stevens made a single first-class appearance for the side, during the 1851–52 season, against Tasmania. From the upper-middle order, he scored a duck in the first innings in which he batted, and five runs in the second.

References

External links
John Stevens at CricketArchive

1811 births
1891 deaths
Australian cricketers
Victoria cricketers
Melbourne Cricket Club cricketers
Cricketers from Mumbai